Bertram William Hudson (July 14, 1910 – February 17, 1988) was a Canadian professional ice hockey player from 1930 until 1945.

Career 
During his career time, Hudson played for St. Louis Flyers, Kansas City Americans, Omaha Knights, Philadelphia Arrows, Pittsburgh Shamrocks, Pittsburgh Hornets, Hershey Bears, Indianapolis Capitals and the Providence Reds. During the 1935–36 season, Hudson the led the Shamrocks with 20 goals. He was also one of only two Shamrocks players to become members of the Pittsburgh Hornets. Later in his career, Hudson worked as a player-coach for the Kansas City Americans in 1940.

External links
Bill Hudson's stats
Bill Hudson's profile
1935-36 Pittsburgh Shamrocks (IHL) Season Capsule
Bill Hudson's genealogical profile
Note regarding Bill Hudson's participation with the 1924 Jimmies hockey team

References

1910 births
1988 deaths
Hershey Bears players
Omaha Ak-Sar-Ben Knights players
Ice hockey people from Calgary
Philadelphia Arrows players
Pittsburgh Shamrocks players
Pittsburgh Hornets players
Providence Reds players
St. Louis Flyers players
Canadian ice hockey centres
Canadian expatriate ice hockey players in the United States